Mir Shamsuddin Adib-Soltani (born 11 May 1931) is an Iranian philosopher and translator. He is known for translating some classic philosophy books into Persian. Adib-Soltani is a winner of Farabi International Award.

Books
 An introduction to the writing of the Persian script. Amirkabir Publications, Tehran, 1976.
 The Question of the Left and Its Future: Notes of an Onlooker, Hermes Publishers, Tehran, 2010. 
 Topics in Decision Problem, Amir Kabir Publishers, Tehran, 2013. 

TranslationsCritique of Pure Reason by Immanuel KantOrganon by AristotleTractatus Logico-Philosophicus by Ludwig WittgensteinPrinciples of Mathematical Logic by David Hilbert and Wilhelm AckermannPhilosophical Essays by Bertrand RussellThe Tragedy of Hamlet, Prince of Denmark by William ShakespeareThe Tragedy of King Richard the third'' by William Shakespeare

References

20th-century Iranian philosophers
Living people
1931 births
Translators to Persian
Iranian political philosophers
Iranian translators
Farabi International Award recipients
21st-century Iranian philosophers
University of Tehran alumni
People from Borujerd